The Women's synchronized 3 metre springboard competition at the 2022 World Aquatics Championships was held on 3 July 2022.

Results
The preliminary round was started at 11:00. The final was held at 15:00.

Green denotes finalists

References

Women's synchronized 3 metre springboard